Rascoff is a surname. Notable people with the surname include: 

Samuel Rascoff, legal scholar at New York University School of Law
Spencer Rascoff, co-founder of Hotwire.com